Joseph S. Freedman (born 1946) is Professor of History at Alabama State University in Montgomery, Alabama. He has been an Assistant (2000-2005), Associate (2005-2008), and Full Professor (2008-2012) of Education there. His primary area of research is academic philosophy (Schulphilosophie) during the Early Modern Period with an emphasis on Central Europe. He publishes extensively on the history of philosophy and history of education. Freedman received his BA in History 1969, his MA in History in 1972, and his PhD in History in 1982, all from the University of Wisconsin–Madison. His PhD dissertation focused on philosophy and philosophical issues in historical perspective, together with the history of education.

He was also trained as a librarian and an archivist, earning a Master of Information and Library Science (University of Michigan, 1990). Freedman received his BA in History  in 1969, his MA in History in 1972, and his PhD in History in 1982, all from the University of Wisconsin–Madison. He has worked since 2005 in the information field as a librarian, library manager, and university archivist. His secondary areas of research are archival theory from the 16th through the 19th centuries and subject-classifications during the early modern period.

Freedman has been a visiting professor at the Universities of Halle-Wittenberg (2004), Munich (2006), and Coimbra (2009). He has also given lectures at the Universities of Basel, Bern, Copenhagen, Halle-Wittenberg, Leipzig, Salzburg, and Tübingen as well as at Trinity College, Dublin. He was a fellow at the Max-Planck Institute for Legal History (2002), the Scaliger Institute at the University of Leiden (2003, 2004), the Johannes a Lasco Bibliothek in Emden (2005), the Berlin State Library (2011), and the Herzog August Bibliothek Wolfenbüttel (2012, 2013). He was also an Honorary Fellow at the Historisches Kolleg in Munich in 2014.

Selected publications
 (3 volumes: unpublished PHD dissertation)
 (2 volumes)
 (Collection of previously-published essays)

Selected articles
"Aristotelianism and Humanism in the Late Reformation German Philosophy: The case of Clemens Timpler" in The Harvest of Humanism in Central Europe: Essays in Honor of Lewis W. Spitz, Fleischer, Manfred P., ed. St. Louis: Concordia Publishing House, 1992.
"Classifications of Philosophy, the Sciences, and the Arts in Sixteenth- and Seventeenth-Century Europe" in The Modern Schoolman, St. Louis University, 1994, p. 37ff.

"Melancthon's Opinion of Ramus and the Utilization of Their Writings in Central Europe" in The Influence of Petrus Ramus: Studies in sixteenth and seventeenth century philosophy and sciences, Feingold, Mordechai, Freedman, Joseph S., and Rother, Wolfgang, eds. Schwabe, 2001. 
"A Neglected Treatise on Scientific Method (methodus scientifica) Published by Johannes Bellarinus in 1606" in Geschiche Der Hermeneutik Und Die Methodik Der Textinterpretierenden Disziplinen, Schonert, Jorg and Vollhardt, Freidrich, eds. Walter de Gruyter, 2005, p. 43ff.

References

External links

 Bibliography of Joseph S. Freedman on Philosophy in Central Europe (1500-1700)
 Alabama State University – History Faculty

Alabama State University faculty
American historians of philosophy
University of Wisconsin–Madison College of Letters and Science alumni
University of Michigan School of Information alumni
1946 births
Living people
Jewish American academics
21st-century American Jews